Achaea finita, the finite achaea, is a moth in the family Erebidae. It is found in the Democratic Republic of the Congo, Eritrea, Ethiopia, Ghana, Kenya, Réunion, Madagascar, Mozambique, Nigeria, Rwanda, Sierra Leone, South Africa, Uganda, Zambia and Zimbabwe.

The larvae have been recorded feeding on Arachis hypogaea, Citrus species, Hibiscus sabdariffa, Phaseolus species, Pisum sativum, Ricinus communis and Solanum tuberosum.

References

Moths described in 1852
Achaea (moth)
Moths of Cape Verde
Erebid moths of Africa
Moths of Madagascar
Moths of Mauritius
Moths of Réunion
Moths of the Middle East